Macropteranthes is a genus containing five species of woody shrub native to northern Australia.

Four species, M. fitzalanii, M. leichhardtii, M. leiocaulis, and M. montana, are found in Queensland, predominantly along the northeastern coast. M. kekwickii, commonly known as bullwaddy, is found in the Northern Territory.

References

Combretaceae
Myrtales genera
Flora of the Northern Territory
Flora of Queensland